KwaDukuza, also known as Stanger, is a municipality in KwaZulu-Natal, South Africa. In 2006, the municipal name was changed to KwaDukuza (which incorporates small towns such as Stanger, Balito, Shaka's Kraal,  but the Zulu people in the area called it "Dukuza" well before then.

The city has been under major economical construction since 2015, having built a multi-million rand regional shopping mall in 2018.

History

The city was founded about 1820 by King Shaka and was named KwaDukuza because of the capital's labyrinth of huts. After Shaka was assassinated on 22 September 1828 during a coup by two of his half-brothers, Dingane and Umthlangana (Mhlangane), the city was burnt to the ground. In 1873, European settlers built a town on the site, naming it Stanger after William Stanger, the surveyor-general of Natal.

Stanger became a municipality in 1949 and is the commercial, magisterial and railway centre of an important sugar-producing district. A small museum adjoins the site of Shaka's grave, a grain pit in the city centre. The city and its vibrant inhabitants are surrounded by sugar cane fields, bush and the mahogany tree where Shaka held meetings, which still stands in front of the municipal offices. The Shaka Day festival, a colourful ceremony of 10,000 or more Zulus, is held at the KwaDukuza Recreation Grounds on 24 September every year. The festival is usually attended by dignitaries to mark the significance of the Zulu nation.

In 2006, the Minister of Arts and Culture approved a name change from Stanger to KwaDukuza, which was published in the Government Gazette of South Africa on 3 March 2006.

The KwaDukuza Museum houses historical items and information on Shaka, the sugar industry and local history. The city has a South Asian influence because of the influx of labourers from India in the late 19th and the early 20th centuries for sugarcane barons, such as Liege Hulett. The first few hundred Indian families left Port Natal for the cane farms on 17 November 1860. The importation of Indian labourers was stopped in 1911, when their numbers exceeded 100,000. Most Indians did not return when their work contracts expired, but exchanged their return-trip passes for money or property. The growth of the Indian community changed the economic and cultural nature of the city and has successfully developed it into what it is today. Celebrations include Diwali and the Winter Fair, the latter being a fundraiser for child welfare. 

In July, 2021, the city was significantly impacted by large scale looting, vandalism, property damage and civil unrest caused during the 2021 South African unrest, much to the dismay of the Indian population.

Administration and public services 

KwaDukuza is governed by the KwaDukuza Local Municipality, which is part of the larger iLembe District Municipality. Not only does KwaDukuza serve the role and function of the main economic hub for the North Coast of KwaZulu-Natal (Dolphin Coast), but it is also the administrative seat for both the iLembe District Municipaliity and KwaDukuza Local Municipality, including the municipal administrative offices and the council chambers of both municipalities. KwaDukuza houses the KwaDukuza Magistrates Court serving the iLembe District's magisterial district as well as regional branches for the Department of Home Affairs and the South African Social Security Agency (SASSA).

Geography 
Located on the North Coast of KwaZulu-Natal, KwaDukuza lies approximately 73 km north-west of Durban by road and 106 km south-west of Richards Bay by road. The city lies on the banks of the Mbozamo River and is situated slightly inland from the Indian Ocean, just approximately 8 km east from the coastal village of Blythedale Beach on a terrain characterised by gentle rolling hills. KwaDukuza's nearest settlements, other than Blythedale Beach include Darnall (12 km), Shakaskraal (16 km), Tinley Manor Beach (18 km), Zinkwazi Beach (21 km) and Ballito (30 km).

Suburban areas
 Dawnside
 Gledhow
 Glen Hills
 High Ridge
 Larkfield
 Northlands
 Shakville
 Stanger Ext 2
 Stanger Ext 3
 Stanger Ext 5
 Stanger Ext 6
 Stanger Ext 7
 Stanger Ext 8
 Stanger Ext 9
 Stanger Ext 10
 Stanger Ext 12
 Stanger Ext 14
 Stanger Ext 15
 Stanger Ext 17
 Stanger Ext 18
 Stanger Ext 19
 Stanger Ext 21
 Stanger Ext 22
 Stanger Ext 24
 Stanger Ext 25
 Stanger Ext 26
 Stanger Ext 27
 Stanger Ext 29
 Stanger Ext 31
 Stanger Ext 32
 Stanger Ext 33
 Stanger Ext 34
 Stanger Ext 35
 Townview
 Warrenton

Climate
The Köppen-Geiger climate classification system classifies the KwaDuzuka climate as humid subtropical (Cfa), with more rain in the summer.

Infrastructure

Healthcare
KwaDukuza has of two major hospitals, General Justice Gizenga Mpanza Regional Hospital, in the city centre which serves as iLembe's largest and main public hospital and the KwaDukuza Private Hospital, on the southern outskirts of the city which was opened in February 2018. Other than hospitals, KwaDukuza has three public clinics which fall under the jurisdiction of the General Justice Gizenga Mpanza Regional Hospital, including Glenhills Clinic, to the west of the city, KwaDukuza Clinic, just south of the city centre and the Nandi Clinic, north of the city.

Schools
Stanger Manor Secondary School
Stanger Secondary School
Glenhills Secondary School
Glenhills Primary School
Stanger M.L. Sultan Secondary School
Stanger High School
Dawnview Primary School
Zakkariyya Muslim School
Stanger Primary School
Stanger Manor Primary School
Stanger South Secondary School
Tshelenkosi secondary school

Transport 
KwaDukuza's three main arterial routes include the N2, R74 and R102. The N2 highway is the main freeway passing KwaDukuza, running from Ballito and Durban in the south-west to Empangeni and Richards Bay in the north-east, with the R74 interchange (Exit 233) providing the main access way from the N2 into KwaDukuza. Alternatively the Groutville interchange (Exit 226), south of KwaDukuza can be used to access the town from the N2. The R74 begins at the interchange with the N2 just east of the city, bypassing the city centre to the north and runs north-westwards to Greytown in the Midlands of KwaZulu-Natal. The extension of the R74 from the N2 interchange is a small secondary road connecting to the coastal village of Blythedale Beach. The R102, running parallel to the N2 highway runs from Shakaskraal and oThongathi in the south-west, bypassing the city centre to the east and runs north-eastwards to KwaGingindlovu and Empangeni.

Notable residents
 King Shaka
 Albert Luthuli
 Kader Asmal
 Aldin Grout
 King Dingane
 Elijah 'Tap Tap' Makhatini

See also
Shaka Memorial

References

Populated places in the KwaDukuza Local Municipality
1820 establishments in Africa
Establishments in the Zulu Kingdom